This is a complete List of National Historic Landmarks in Oregon. The United States National Historic Landmark (NHL) program is operated under the auspices of the National Park Service, and recognizes buildings, structures, districts, objects, and similar resources nationwide according to a list of criteria of national significance. The state of Oregon is home to 17 of these landmarks, two of which extend beyond Oregon's borders into other states, as well as one site from which NHL status was withdrawn upon its destruction.

Background

The National Historic Landmark program is administered by the National Park Service, a branch of the U.S. Department of the Interior. The National Park Service determines which properties meet NHL criteria and makes nomination recommendations after an owner notification process.  The Secretary of the Interior reviews nominations and, based on a set of predetermined criteria, makes a decision on NHL designation or a determination of eligibility for designation. Both public and privately owned properties are designated as NHLs. This designation provides indirect, partial protection of the historic integrity of the properties, via tax incentives, grants, monitoring of threats, and other means.  Owners may object to the nomination of the property as a NHL; when this is the case the Secretary of the Interior can only designate a site as eligible for designation.

NHLs are also included on the National Register of Historic Places (NRHP), which are historic properties that the National Park Service deems to be worthy of preservation. The primary difference between a NHL and a NRHP listing is that the NHLs are determined to have particular national significance, while other NRHP properties may be deemed significant at the local or state level. The NHLs in Oregon comprise 0.8% of the approximately 1,900 properties and districts listed on the NRHP in Oregon.

Current National Historic Landmarks

|}

Former National Historic Landmark

See also

Historic preservation
List of U.S. National Historic Landmarks by state
Lists of Oregon-related topics
National Register of Historic Places listings in Oregon

References

External links

National Historic Landmark Program at the National Park Service
Lists of National Historic Landmarks

Oregon
 
National Historic Landmarks in Oregon
National Historic Landmarks